The 2018–19 Duleep Trophy was the 57th season of the Duleep Trophy, a first-class cricket tournament in India, which took place in August and September 2018. India Red were the defending champions. All of the matches took place at the NPR College Ground in Dindigul. The BCCI's technical committee structured the tournament to have four teams from four Ranji Trophy Groups, similar to the 2002–03 Duleep Trophy, but on the day of team selections, the format of the previous season was retained.

All three round-robin matches finished as draws. The first match, India Red took three points, as a result of a first-innings lead, with India Green getting one point. The second match, India Red had a first-innings lead over India Blue, therefore gaining three points, and advancing to the final. In the third and final match, India Blue finished with a first-innings lead against India Green, and advanced to the final.

India Blue won the tournament, beating India Red by an innings and 187 runs in the final.

Squads

Akshay Wadkar replaced Abhishek Gupta in India Red's squad, as Gupta's doping ban was going to expire after the start of the Duleep Trophy. On 22 August, Siddhesh Lad and Ricky Bhui were released from their Quadrangular Series squads and added to the India Red and Blue teams respectively.

Points table

 Top two teams advance to the Final.

Fixtures

Round-robin

Final

References

External links
 Series home at ESPN Cricinfo

Duleep Trophy seasons
Duleep Trophy
Duleep Trophy
Duleep Trophy Final